Kallisomyia is a genus of parasitic flies in the family Tachinidae.

Species
Kallisomyia stackelbergi Borisova-Zinovjeva, 1964

Distribution
China, Russia.

References

Diptera of Asia
Monotypic Brachycera genera
Exoristinae
Tachinidae genera